Euphaea is a genus of damselflies in the family Euphaeidae. There are more than 30 described species in Euphaea, found mainly in Indomalaya.

Species
These 33 species belong to the genus Euphaea:

 Euphaea ameeka van Tol & Norma-Rashid, 1995
 Euphaea amphicyana Ris, 1930
 Euphaea aspasia Selys, 1853
 Euphaea basalis (Laidlaw, 1915)
 Euphaea bocki McLachlan, 1880
 Euphaea cardinalis (Fraser, 1924)
 Euphaea cora Ris, 1930
 Euphaea cyanopogon Hämäläinen, Kosterin & Kompier, 2019
 Euphaea decorata Hagen in Selys, 1853 (black-banded gossamerwing)
 Euphaea dispar Rambur, 1842 (nilgiri torrent dart)
 Euphaea formosa Hagen in Selys, 1869
 Euphaea fraseri (Laidlaw, 1920)
 Euphaea guerini Rambur, 1842
 Euphaea hirta Hämäläinen & Karube, 2001
 Euphaea impar Selys, 1859 (blue-sided satinwing)
 Euphaea inouei Asahina, 1977
 Euphaea lara Krüger, 1898
 Euphaea masoni Selys, 1879
 Euphaea modigliani Selys, 1898
 Euphaea ochracea Selys, 1859
 Euphaea opaca Selys, 1853 (Sooty Gossamerwing)
 Euphaea ornata (Campion, 1924)
 Euphaea pahyapi Hämäläinen, 1985
 Euphaea refulgens Hagen in Selys, 1853
 Euphaea sanguinea Kompier & Hayashi, 2018
 Euphaea saola Phan & Hayashi, 2018
 Euphaea splendens Hagen in Selys, 1853
 Euphaea subcostalis Selys, 1873
 Euphaea subnodalis (Laidlaw, 1915)
 Euphaea superba Kimmins, 1936
 Euphaea tricolor Selys, 1859
 Euphaea variegata Rambur, 1842
 Euphaea yayeyamana Matsumura & Oguma, 1913

References

Further reading

External links

 

Euphaeidae